Cerosterna perakensis is a species of beetle in the family Cerambycidae. It was described by Stephan von Breuning in 1976. It is known from Malaysia and Borneo.

References

Lamiini
Beetles described in 1976